The President of Pakistan, officially the President of the Islamic Republic of Pakistan, is the ceremonial head of state of Pakistan and the commander-in-chief of the Pakistan Armed Forces.

The office of president was created upon the proclamation of Islamic Republic on 23 March 1956. The then serving governor-general, Major-General Iskander Mirza, assumed office as the first president. Following the 1958 coup d'etat, the office of prime minister was abolished, leaving the Presidency as the most powerful office in the country. This position was further strengthened when the 1962 Constitution was adopted. It turned Pakistan into a Presidential Republic, giving all executive powers to the president. In 1973, the new Constitution established Parliamentary democracy and reduced the president's role to a ceremonial one. Nevertheless, the military takeover in 1977 reversed the changes. The 8th Amendment turned Pakistan into a semi-presidential republic and in the period between 1985 and 2010, the executive power was shared by the president and prime minister. The 18th Amendment in 2010 restored Parliamentary Democracy in the country, and reduced the presidency to a ceremonial position.

The constitution prohibits the president from directly running the government. Instead, the executive power is exercised on his behalf by the prime minister who keeps him informed on all matters of internal and foreign policy, as well as all legislative proposals. The Constitution however, vests the president with the powers of granting pardons, reprieves, and the control over the military; however, all appointments at higher commands of the military must be made by the President on a "required and necessary" basis, upon consultation and approval from the prime minister.

The president is indirectly elected by the Electoral College for a five-year term. The Constitution requires the president to be a "Muslim of not less than forty five (45) years of age". The president resides in an estate in Islamabad known as Aiwan-e-Sadar (President's House). In his absence, the chairman of Senate exercises the responsibilities of the post, until the actual president resumes office, or the next office holder is elected.

There have been a total of 13 presidents. The first president was Iskander Ali Mirza who entered office on 23 March 1956. The current office holder is Arif Alvi, who took charge on 9 September 2018, following his victory in the 2018 elections.

Powers and authority

Role of the president

The official residence and principal workplace of the president is Aiwan-e-Sadr— the presidential palace located in northeastern Islamabad. The presidency forms the vital institutional organ of state and is part of the bicameral Parliament.

Powers to exercise the authority are limited to the ceremonial figurehead, and required to address the Parliament to give a direction for national policies before being informed of its key decisions.

In addition, the president is also a civil commander-in-chief of the military, with chairman joint chiefs being its chief military adviser to maintain the control of the military. After a thorough confirmation comes from the prime minister, the president confirms the judicial appointments in the national court system. In addition, the Constitution allows the president to grant pardons, reprieves, and clemency in cases recommended to him by the executive and the judiciary. The president himself has absolute constitutional immunity from criminal and civil proceedings, and no proceedings can be initiated or continued against him during the term of his office.

From 2000 until 2009, the president was the chairman of the National Security Council who had authority and control over the nuclear and strategic arsenals; however, the chairmanship and the powers transferred back to the prime minister. Furthermore, the presidential powers have significantly declined with Pakistan's government reversed to a parliamentary democratic republic.

Eligibility and selection process

The Constitution of Pakistan sets the principle qualifications that the candidate must meet to be eligible to the office of the president. A president has to be:
 A citizen of Pakistan
 A Muslim
 At least 45 years of age
 Qualified to be elected as member of the National Assembly

Whenever the Aiwan-e-Sadr becomes vacant, the selection of president is done by the electoral college, which consists of both houses of Parliament (the Senate and National Assembly) and the four provincial assemblies. The chief election commissioner has to conduct elections to the office of the president in a special session. Voting takes place in secrecy.

Each elector casts a different number of votes. The general principle is that the total number of votes cast by members of Parliament equals the total number of votes cast by provincial legislators. Each of the provincial legislatures has an equal number of votes to each other, based on the number of members of the smallest legislature, which is the Balochistan Assembly (65 seats).

The constitution further states that election to the office of president will not be held earlier than sixty days and not later than thirty days before the expiration of the term of the president in office.

Election and oath

The president is elected indirectly for a term of five years. The incumbent president is eligible for re-election to that office, but cannot hold that office for more than two consecutive terms. The president is required to make and subscribe in the presence of the chief justice—, an oath or affirmation that the president shall protect, preserve and defend the Constitution as follows:

Line of succession and removal

The Constitution discusses the possibility of an acting president. Certain office-holders, however, are permitted to stand as presidential candidates in case of vacancy as the constitution does not include a position of vice president:
 The chairman of the Senate of Pakistan
 The speaker of the National Assembly of Pakistan.
The president may be removed before the expiry of the term through impeachment. The president can be removed for violation of the Constitution of Pakistan.

The impeachment process may start in either of the two houses of the Parliament. The house initiates the process by leveling the charges against the president. The charges are contained in a notice that has to be signed by either the chairman or the speaker of the National Assembly through a two-thirds majority. The notice is sent up to the president, and 14 days later it is taken up for consideration.

A resolution to impeach the president has to be passed by the two-thirds majority. The speaker of the National Assembly then summons the joint session not earlier than seven days. The president has the right to defend oneself.

If the resolution is passed by the two-thirds majority at the joint session declaring that the president is unfit to hold the office due to incapacity or is guilty of violating the Constitution or of gross misconduct, then the president shall cease to hold office immediately on the passing of the resolution.

No president has been impeached. However, the proceedings have been used in 2008 in an attempt to impeach former president Pervez Musharraf who tendered the resignation after the proceedings above were used.

List of presidents

Political background

Early origins

From 1947 until 1956, the governor-general of Pakistan acted for the head of state: King George VI (until 1952) and Queen Elizabeth II (from 1952). With the promulgation of the first constitution, Pakistan became an Islamic republic in 1956, and the governor-general was replaced with the presidency. The incumbent governor-general, Iskander Mirza, became Pakistan's first president. He reportedly suspended the first constitution in 1958, and appointed Army commander-in-chief General Ayub Khan as the first chief martial law administrator. Khan subsequently dismissed Mirza in order to become the president.

The second constitution introduced by President Ayub Khan turned the country into a presidential republic without direct elections. Succumbing to internal and international pressure, however, Khan held a nationwide presidential election in 1965. Khan successfully campaigned against his opponent, Fatima Jinnah, for a second term, but some have alleged that elections were rigged in favour of Khan.

Controversy regarding the U-2 incident (1960), privatization (1963), and war with India (1965), fueled a fierce left-wing opposition movement led by Zulfikar Ali Bhutto of the PPP and Bengali nationalist Sheikh Mujibur Rahman who, with the support of demonstrators, aimed to further weaken the presidency. Suffering from paralysis and declining health, Ayub Khan handed over the presidency to army chief General Yahya Khan, who imposed martial law and announced that national elections would be held in 1970. Eventually, general elections were held in 1970 which saw the PPP gaining a majority of seats in West Pakistan (current-day Pakistan) and the Awami League gaining a majority in East Pakistan (current-day Bangladesh).

After he was unable to reach a compromise between the PPP and the Awami League, President Yahya Khan invited Nurul Amin of the Pakistan Muslim League to become the prime minister, and also appointed him as the first vice president. The growing instigated violence against Pakistanis in East Pakistan forced President Yahya Khan to use force in order to maintain order there, which further escalated Bengali resistance (1970). Preemptive strikes against India led to another war in 1971, which freed East Pakistan and created Bangladesh.

Taking personal responsibility for the political isolation and devastation of Pakistan after the fall of East Pakistan, President Yahya Khan stepped down and ceded power to Zulfikar Ali Bhutto. President Bhutto created the current Constitution of Pakistan in 1973, transforming Pakistan into a parliamentary democracy, and reducing presidential powers to that of a ceremonial figurehead.

Past Interventions
The general elections held in 1977 resulted in an atmosphere of civil unrest instigated by the right-wing alliance, the Pakistan National Alliance. The events leading to it resulted in military intervention by chief of army staff General Zia-ul-Haq and Chairman Joint Chiefs Admiral Mohammad Shariff. Suspending the Constitution in 1977, General Zia-ul-Haq took over the presidency in 1978. Zia's presidency oversaw the modern growth of far-right ideas in the country. Succumbing to domestic pressure to restore the Constitution, President Zia-ul-Haq held a referendum (1984) and called for general elections in 1985. President Zia-ul-Haq appointed Mohammad Junejo as prime minister and assumed more powers through the constitutional amendment. After dismissing Prime Minister Junejo, President Zia-ul-Haq announced that new general elections would be held, but President Zia died in a plane crash in 1988.

The general elections held in 1988 witnessed the victory of PPP in 1988 and appointed Senate chairman Ghulam Ishaq Khan to the presidency. The conflict between Prime Minister Benazir Bhutto and President Ghulam Ishaq Khan arose in two areas regarding the issues of appointments. President Ghulam Ishaq Khan repeatedly intervened in government matters and leveled charges against Prime Minister Benazir Bhutto; thus dismissing Prime Minister Benazir Bhutto in 1990. After holding general elections in 1990, Nawaz Sharif brought up an ideologically conservative government and President Ghulam Ishaq Khan unsuccessfully tried to dismiss Sharif. After a successful intervention by Supreme Court and Chairman of the Joint Chiefs General Shamim Allam, President Ghulam Ishaq Khan and Prime Minister Nawaz Sharif tendered resignations in 1993.

Following the new elections held in 1993, Prime Minister Benazir Bhutto established a strong government after appointing loyalists Farooq Leghari to the presidency. However, the corruption charges and the controversial death of Murtaza Bhutto in 1996 resulted in President Farooq Leghari dismissing Prime Minister Benazir Bhutto. In 1997, President Farooq Leghari could not overcome the heavy mandate bestowed on Prime Minister Nawaz Sharif by the public in 1997. President Leghari unsuccessfully supported Chief Justice Sajjad Ali Shah— both of them resigned, ending the conflict between the Judiciary, the Executive, and the Parliament. After appointing Rafiq Tarar, the Parliament successfully passed constitutional amendment to decisively limit the presidency. After staging a controversial self coup in 1999, General Pervez Musharraf dismissed Prime Minister Nawaz Sharif and President Rafiq Tarar in 2001 while assuming more powers to the presidency. In January 2004, the Electoral College elected Musharraf, and as a result he was, according to the Constitution, "deemed to be elected".

President Musharraf's repeated unconstitutional intervention resulted in a standoff with the Judiciary, and declared a state of emergency in 2007, after dismissing the senior justices of the Supreme Court. Although Musharraf was elected in 2007, the constitutional legality of Musharraf's rule was found dubious. A populist constitutional movement eventually resulted in Musharraf's departure. On 22 August 2008, the electoral commission called for presidential nominations to be delivered by 26 August 2008 and for elections to be held on 6 September 2008.

Figurehead overview

After the presidential election held in 2008, Asif Ali Zardari lobbied for constitutional amendment to restore the Constitution as it was in 1973. In 2010, the Parliament unanimously and with a large majority, passed the eighteenth amendment of the constitution. It revoked the presidential powers and changed Pakistan from a semi-presidential system of government to a parliamentary republic, with great hopes of governmental stability in the future.

See also
Principal Secretary to the President of Pakistan
 Air transports of heads of state and government
 Official state car
 Prime Minister of Pakistan
 Chief Justice of Pakistan
 Chief Justice of the Federal Shariat Court
 Chief of Army Staff of the Pakistan Army
 Constitution of Pakistan
 Foreign Minister of Pakistan
 Finance Minister of Pakistan
 Interior Minister of Pakistan
 Minister of Defence (Pakistan)
 Vice President of Pakistan

References

External links
 President of Pakistan: official website

 
Parliament of Pakistan
Pakistan
1956 establishments in Pakistan